WGTM (1520 AM) was a radio station broadcasting an Oldies/Adult Standards format. It was licensed to Spindale, North Carolina, United States, and is owned by Jesse A. Cowan.

WGTM went silent on November 20, 2015 after losing its transmitter site; on May 3, 2017, it notified the Federal Communications Commission (FCC) that it was unable to find a new site and requested the deletion of its license. The license was canceled on June 29, 2017.

History of call letters
The call letters WGTM used to be assigned to a station in Wilson, North Carolina.

References

External link
FCC Station Search Details: DWGTM (Facility ID: 43713)

GTM
Defunct radio stations in the United States
Radio stations established in 1982
1982 establishments in North Carolina
Radio stations disestablished in 2015
2015 disestablishments in North Carolina
GTM
GTM